Juliet Davenport OBE (born 1968) is a British businesswoman. She founded and is the former chief executive of Good Energy, a renewable energy company in the United Kingdom.

Origins and education
Davenport was born in Haslemere, Surrey, in 1968.

She read physics as an undergraduate at Merton College, Oxford before taking a master's degree in economics and environmental economics at Birkbeck, University of London. She also worked for a year at the European Commission on European energy policy and at the European Parliament on carbon taxation.

Career
Davenport began working with Energy for Sustainable Development, an environmental consultancy. While there, she ran technology models and analysed policies on renewable energy from countries around Europe.

In 1999 Davenport set up Unit[e], a subsidiary of the Monkton Group, of which she later became CEO. In 2003, Unit[e] was renamed Good Energy. The company has won several awards, including being twice named a Sunday Times Best Green Company, Wiltshire Wildlife Trust’s Outstanding Contribution to the Environment 2009 and The Observer’s Ethical Award for best online retail initiative. In 2012, Davenport was named as PLUS CEO of the year.

Davenport was appointed an Officer of the Order of the British Empire in the New Year Honours 2013.

In March 2021 the podcast Great Green Questions launched with Davenport as host. On the series she speaks to a variable panel of celebrities, experts and comedians about the issues of sustainable living.

From 1 May 2021 Davenport stepped down as CEO of Good Energy, and she left the company's board in 2022. She holds a number of non-executive directorships and is chair of Atrato Onsite Energy, a company which installs solar generation on roofs of commercial buildings.

Davenport has been a trustee of the Energy Institute professional membership body since 2019, and in July 2022 was appointed as its president for a three-year term.

Published works

Personal life
Davenport is married to Mark Shorrock and has a daughter and a stepdaughter. Shorrock is an entrepreneur in renewable energy production and a leading proponent of a tidal generation scheme using Swansea Bay, which the UK government considered in 2018 to be not financially viable. Previously, Good Energy had bought a £500,000 stake in Shorrock's company in return for an option to buy 10% of its generated power.

References

Alumni of Merton College, Oxford
English women in business
Officers of the Order of the British Empire
People associated with renewable energy
Living people
1968 births